A Crown entity (from the Commonwealth term Crown) is an organisation that forms part of New Zealand's state sector established under the Crown Entities Act 2004, a unique umbrella governance and accountability statute. The Crown Entities Act is based on the corporate model where the governance of the organisation is split from the management of the organisation.

Subtypes of crown entities
Crown entities come under the following subtypes:

 Statutory entities — bodies corporate established under an Act
 Crown agents — organisations that give effect to government policy, such as the Accident Compensation Corporation, which administers no-fault workers compensation
 Autonomous Crown entities (ACE), which must have regard to government policy, such as Te Papa, the national museum
 Independent Crown entities (ICE), which are generally independent of government policy, such as the Commerce Commission, which enforces legislation promoting competition
 Crown entity companies — registered companies wholly owned by the Crown, including Crown Research Institutes (CRIs) and a small number of other companies
 Crown entity subsidiaries — companies that are subsidiaries of Crown entities
 School boards of trustees
 Tertiary education institutions, including universities, colleges of education, polytechnics, and wānanga

Crown entities can be contrasted with other New Zealand public sector organisational forms: Departments of State, State-Owned Enterprises, Offices of Parliament and sui generis organisations like the Reserve Bank.

Crown entities, responsible ministers and monitoring departments
Under the Crown Entities Act, ministers are required to "oversee and manage" the Crown's interests in the Crown entities within their portfolio (sections 27 and 88). The board of the entity has the key role in ensuring the entity is achieving results within budget. This is done by a monitoring department on behalf of the minister unless other arrangements for monitoring are made. Monitoring departments make explicit agreements with their minister, setting out what monitoring they will undertake and how they will do it. Crown entity boards should also facilitate clear and transparent monitoring, for example, by providing the minister and monitoring department with good information on which to make judgements about performance.

This table is based on one from the State Services Commission.

Abbreviations used
ACE = autonomous Crown entity
CCMAU = Crown Company Monitoring Advisory Unit
CEC = Crown entity company
CRIs = Crown research institutes (all CECs)
ICE = independent Crown entity
TPK = Te Puni Kokiri (Ministry of Maori Development)
MoRST = Ministry of Research, Science and Technology
TEIs = tertiary education institutions
School BoTs = school boards of trustees

See also
 Public sector organisations in New Zealand (listing of Crown entities)
 Regulatory agency
 State Services Commission
 Statutory agency
 Te Arawhiti
 Crown corporations of Canada
 Statutory corporation

References

External links
 
 
 

 
 Crown